Donald Patrick Weston (6 March 1936 – 20 January 2007) was an English professional footballer who played as a centre forward for many football teams during the 1950s and 1960s.

Playing career
Weston first joined Leeds United as a 16-year-old amateur but did not sign a professional contract and later entered National Service at an army camp in North Wales. He was spotted by local Third Division club Wrexham and signed a professional contract with them after completing his military service. He scored 21 goals in 42 appearances for Wrexham in the 1958–59 and 1959–60 seasons before joining Birmingham City for a fee of £15,000 in January 1960 and then Rotherham United for £10,000 in December 1961. He scored 21 goals in 76 appearances, helping Rotherham United to reach the 1961 Football League Cup Final, which they lost 3–2 on aggregate to Aston Villa.

Weston was signed for Leeds United by Don Revie for a fee of £18,000 in December 1962 after the departure of John Charles and scored a hat-trick on his home debut against Stoke City. He made a contribution to Leeds' successful promotion season of 1963–64 but faded from the first team as Alan Peacock and Jim Storrie were favoured for the centre-forward position. He joined Huddersfield Town in October 1965, later rejoined Wrexham, and played for Chester before joining non-league clubs Altrincham and Bethesda Athletic.

Playing statistics

Honours
Second Division Championship 1963–64

References

External links
 Chester City Obituary

1936 births
2007 deaths
Footballers from Mansfield
English footballers
Association football forwards
Wrexham A.F.C. players
Birmingham City F.C. players
Rotherham United F.C. players
Leeds United F.C. players
Huddersfield Town A.F.C. players
Chester City F.C. players
Altrincham F.C. players
English Football League players
Bethesda Athletic F.C. players